TrSS St Patrick was a passenger vessel built for the Great Western Railway in 1906.

History

From 1914 to 1919 she was requisitioned by the British Government as a hospital ship for the duration of the First World War.

On 20 August 1927 she was in collision with her sister ship TrSS St David in Fishguard harbour.

She was re-engined in 1926 and caught fire on 7 April 1929. The fire was attributed to an electrical fault following which she was scrapped.

References

1906 ships
Passenger ships of the United Kingdom
Steamships of the United Kingdom
Ships built on the River Clyde
Ships of the Great Western Railway